Georg Albert Ruthenberg (born August 5, 1959), better known by his stage name Pat Smear, is an American musician. He is best known for being the lead guitarist and co-founder of Los Angeles-based punk band The Germs and for being a rhythm guitarist for grunge band Nirvana, which he joined as a touring guitarist in 1993, and Foo Fighters, with whom he has recorded six studio albums. After Nirvana disbanded following the suicide of its frontman  Kurt Cobain, drummer Dave Grohl went on to become the frontman of rock band Foo Fighters, with Smear joining on guitar. He left Foo Fighters in 1997, before rejoining as a touring guitarist in 2005, and has been a full-time member since 2010.

Early life
Georg Ruthenberg was born and raised in West Los Angeles, California to a mother of African-American and Native American descent and a Jewish German immigrant father. His parents enrolled him in piano lessons at a young age, and a few years later, he began teaching himself to play the guitar. Before becoming a musician, he was a very religious child.

At age 13, he left home to join a commune. Later, he attended Innovative Program School (IPS), an alternative school within University High School in Los Angeles. It was there that he met vocalist Darby Crash, alongside whom he would play in the Germs in the late 1970s. Smear and Crash were both expelled from IPS due to concerns they were inciting unruly behavior among the students.

Career

The Germs (1976–1980)
Smear lists his influences as Joan Jett, Brian James, Brian May, and Steve Jones. He also stated that "all the guitar playing" of John McKay on Siouxsie and the Banshees's first album "really inspired me" and that Yes guitarist Steve Howe is "the best guitarist ever". As a teenager in 1976, Smear and Darby Crash formed the Germs with bassist Lorna Doom and drummer Dottie Danger (the pseudonym of Belinda Carlisle who went on to front The Go-Go's). Smear was the only band member who had any musical knowledge or proficiency at the time. For most of his time in the Germs, Smear reported that he didn't own a guitar but rather "just borrowed from whoever we were playing with".

Carlisle was soon replaced by Don Bolles and, in 1979, the band released their first album, (GI), produced by Joan Jett. The record is now regarded as a milestone in the history of punk rock, with Smear earning praise for his guitar work: "Smear has an equal claim to being the album's star [alongside Darby], though, and for good reason – not only did he co-write everything, his clipped, catchy monster riffing was as pure punk in the late-'70s sense as anything, wasting no time on anything extraneous."

The Germs, along with Smear, appeared in the punk documentary The Decline of Western Civilization (1981), directed by Penelope Spheeris.  Darby Crash died before the film was released, leading to the band breaking up.

Solo work (1980–1993)
Following the demise of the Germs, Smear played in 1981 with the ex-Screamers keyboardist Paul Roessler and his sister Kira Roessler in Twisted Roots. Although short-lived, the band was the toast of the Hollywood punk scene. Smear would go on to play with Nina Hagen and make two solo albums of his own, Ruthensmear (also recorded with Roessler), and So You Fell in Love with a Musician... Smear also had a brief stint as a member of punk band the Adolescents in 1981.

During this time, he also worked as an actor in bit parts, appearing in the television shows Quincy, M.E. and CHiPs, and in the films Blade Runner, Breakin' and Howard the Duck.  While working on Breakin, Smear became friends with Courtney Love. He also appeared as an extra in the music video for Prince and the Revolution's single "Raspberry Beret," sitting in front of Lisa Coleman's piano.

45 Grave (1981)
Smear was briefly in deathrock band 45 Grave with Don Bolles (the former drummer for the Germs). During this stint, they recorded a 7" titled Black Cross and other tracks that would later appear on 45 Grave's 1987 compilation album, Autopsy.

Nirvana (1993–1994)
In 1993, he received a call from Nirvana's frontman Kurt Cobain, asking him to join the band as a second guitarist for an upcoming tour. At first, Smear thought his friend, Carlos "Cake" Nunez, was pranking him; however, Courtney Love had told Smear a few days prior that Cobain was going to call him. Smear accepted immediately and played his first show with Nirvana on Saturday Night Live on September 25, 1993. He toured with Nirvana for about six months. Smear appeared on their live albums MTV Unplugged in New York, From the Muddy Banks of the Wishkah, as well as on material for the compilations Nirvana and With the Lights Out and the concert DVD Live and Loud.

Foo Fighters (1994–1997)
Following Cobain's death, Nirvana drummer Dave Grohl formed a band to support his self-titled album, which would ultimately become known as Foo Fighters. Smear joined the group from its inception in late October 1994, but because their first album was a collection of demos recorded solely by Grohl, Smear did not appear on a Foo Fighters album until The Colour and the Shape (1997).

Shortly after the release of The Colour and the Shape, Smear quit the band. As Smear later explained, he quit mainly due to exhaustion from the band's relentless touring schedule. Smear's departure was also related to inner-band tensions that sprung up around Grohl's divorce from his first wife, Jennifer Youngblood, who was a close friend of Smear. Grohl explained that he "begged" Smear to stay and Smear agreed to remain in Foo Fighters temporarily due to scheduled touring obligations, but only until a replacement guitarist could be recruited. Grohl eventually invited Franz Stahl, his former bandmate from Scream, to fill the lead guitarist slot.

Smear announced his departure from Foo Fighters during a live performance at the 1997 MTV Video Music Awards; he played partway through the set, then introduced Stahl who completed the gig.

Hiatus from Foo Fighters and Germs Reunion (1997–2008)
Smear kept a fairly low profile during his absence from Foo Fighters. He produced the debut album for the band Harlow and made scattered television appearances. He was employed as a creative consultant in a motion picture about the Germs and Darby Crash, entitled What We Do Is Secret, named after one of the band's best-known songs. The film was released at the Los Angeles Film Festival on June 23, 2007, and had a limited theatrical release in 2008 and now available on DVD. In the film, Smear is depicted by actor Rick Gonzalez. In 2005, he began performing reunion shows with the Germs, including actor Shane West, who portrays Darby Crash in the film, filling in as lead vocalist.

Rejoining Foo Fighters (2005–present) 

In late 2005, Smear began performing select shows with Foo Fighters again. He continued to play intermittently with the group, often not for the entirety of a concert, before fully rejoining in 2010 and participating in the recording of what would become the album Wasting Light. He went on to record with the rest of the band on their eighth studio album, Sonic Highways.

Nirvana reunions
During the Foo Fighters' Friday night performance at Bumbershoot Festival on August 29, 1997, Nirvana bassist Krist Novoselic joined his former bandmates Dave Grohl and Pat Smear on stage for the Foo's encore to salute the late Kurt Cobain. Grohl took his position on drums, Novoselic played bass, and Smear accompanied on guitar. A spotlight encompassed the microphone stand to honor Cobain, who died by suicide on April 5, 1994. They performed a cover of Prince's "Purple Rain", after which a roadie for the Foo Fighters joined them on stage and sang a version of Led Zeppelin's "Communication Breakdown".

On December 22, 2010, the remaining members of Nirvana played together during a Foo Fighters show at Paladino's in Tarzana, California, which was recorded for a documentary.

On December 12, 2012, Smear, Novoselic and Grohl reunited again for a televised Live Aid Hurricane Sandy benefit. This time, they were fronted by Paul McCartney. They performed "Cut Me Some Slack", the first track from the film soundtrack for Sound City.

On December 15, 2012, they performed "Cut Me Some Slack" on Saturday Night Live, once again fronted by McCartney.

On July 19, 2013, Smear, Novoselic and Grohl reunited on-stage, again with Paul McCartney, during both the first and second encores of McCartney's "Out There" tour stop at Safeco Field, Seattle. They performed "Cut Me Some Slack", as well as numerous Beatles' songs.

On April 11, 2014, Nirvana was inducted into the Rock and Roll Hall of Fame. Though Smear was not inducted, he joined Dave Grohl and Krist Novoselic on stage for performances of Nirvana songs along with Joan Jett, Lorde, St. Vincent and Kim Gordon.

The surviving Nirvana members reunited yet again with Joan Jett, Deer Tick's John McCauley, as well as The Distillers' Brody Dalle for a six-song encore set to close out Cal Jam 18 on Saturday, October 6, 2018, at Glen Helen Amphitheater in San Bernardino, Calif.

Smear was inducted into the Rock and Roll Hall of Fame in 2021 as a member of the Foo Fighters. His former band mate from The Germs, Dottie Danger (Belinda Carlisle), was inducted the same year as a member of The Go-Go's.

Gear
Smear for a long span of his career almost exclusively used Hagström guitars, after buying one late during his time in the Germs and went on to collaborate on a signature guitar with the company. Smear now primarily uses Gibson guitars. He can be seen with classic models such as a White SG Custom or a Les Paul but mostly custom shop variations on the rare Johnny A model. Smear also uses a Gibson Barney Kessel model guitar while playing with the Foo Fighters. 

For the MTV Unplugged in New York performance, Smear used a Buck Owens American acoustic guitar, which belonged to Krist Novoselic.

Personal life
According to the 2011 documentary Foo Fighters: Back and Forth, Smear was married at the time and has had at least one child.

Discography
With the Germs
Forming/Sexboy (1977)
Lexicon Devil (1978)
(GI) (1979)
The Decline of Western Civilization Soundtrack (1980)
What We Do Is Secret (1981)
Live at the Whisky, First Show Ever (1981)
Germicide (1985)
(MIA) - The Complete Anthology (1993)

With The Martyrs
 Pig Pen Victim / Social Sacrifice (7") (1979)

With 45 Grave
Black Cross/Wax (1981)

With Twisted Roots
Pretentiawhat (1981)
 Twisted Roots (Comp.) (2004)

With Vagina Dentata
"Work Till Your Dead" - Flipside Video Fanzine Number Five (Comp.) (VHS) (1984)
"Golden Boys"  - Flipside Vinyl Fanzine Vol. 2 (Comp.) (1985)
"Creep Street" - Chaotic Reasoning Vol. 2 (Comp.) (2012)

With Tater Totz
 Alien Sleestacks From Brazil (Unfinished Music Volume 3) (1988)
 Mono! Stereo: Sgt. Shonen's Exploding Plastic Eastman Band Request (1989)
 Tater Comes Alive! (Tot Live! If You Want It!) (1992)

With Gary Celebrity
 Diary Of A Monster (1992)

Solo
Ruthensmear (1987)
 "Lazybones" - Every Band Has A Shonen Knife Who Loves Them (Various Artists Shonen Knife Tribute Comp.) (1989)
So You Fell in Love with a Musician... (1992)

With Deathfolk
Deathfolk (1989)
Deathfolk II (1992)

With Belinda Carlisle
Real (1993)

With Nirvana
MTV Unplugged in New York (1994)
From the Muddy Banks of the Wishkah (1996)
Nirvana (2002)
With the Lights Out (2004)
In Utero 20th Anniversary Deluxe Edition (2013)

With Skull Control
 "Electric Church" - Radio Danger (1994)

With Mike Watt
Ball-Hog or Tugboat? (1995)
"Ring Spiel" Tour '95 (2016)

With Foo Fighters
The Colour and the Shape (1997)
Skin and Bones (2006; additional player)
Echoes, Silence, Patience & Grace (2007; guest player on track 2)
Live at Wembley Stadium (2008; additional)
Wasting Light (2011)
Sonic Highways (2014)
Saint Cecilia (2015)
Concrete and Gold (2017)
Medicine at Midnight (2021)

With Paul McCartney
"Cut Me Some Slack" (2012)

With theHell
Southern Medicine (2013)

References

External links
 
 
 

1959 births
Living people
African-American guitarists
African-American rock musicians
African-American male singer-songwriters
American people of German-Jewish descent
American people who self-identify as being of Native American descent
American punk rock guitarists
Foo Fighters members
Germs (band) members
Grunge musicians
Jewish American musicians
Nirvana (band) members
University High School (Los Angeles) alumni
Adolescents (band) members
Grammy Award winners
Guitarists from Los Angeles
20th-century American guitarists
Capitol Records artists
Geffen Records artists
Slash Records artists
Singer-songwriters from California
African-American Jews
Jews in punk rock